Edgewood Historic District is a national historic district located at Charleston, West Virginia.  The district is set on the West Side of the city and was the first planned suburb in Charleston.  The area developed in the early 20th century.  The architectural styles of Edgewood are eclectic, ranging from Neo-Classicism to Neo-Colonial, from Craftsman to Bungaloid.

It was listed on the National Register of Historic Places in 1989.

References

American Craftsman architecture in West Virginia
Bungalow architecture in West Virginia
Houses in Charleston, West Virginia
Neoclassical architecture in West Virginia
Colonial Revival architecture in West Virginia
Historic districts in Charleston, West Virginia
Houses on the National Register of Historic Places in West Virginia
National Register of Historic Places in Charleston, West Virginia
Victorian architecture in West Virginia
Historic districts on the National Register of Historic Places in West Virginia